Terence Brain (14 August 1907 – 15 August 1984) was a leading Australian rules footballer of the 1930s who played with South Melbourne in the Victorian Football League (VFL).

The son of a boot repairer, Brain grew up in the South Melbourne area but boarded in Clifton Hill, which was in opposing team Collingwood's recruiting zone. Following Collingwood's request to transfer Brain, South Melbourne named him in the senior side in 1928. A lightly built rover, Brain was one of the few Victorians in the South Melbourne side of the 1930s which was known as the 'foreign legion'. Brain played 141 games for the club, including the 1933 VFL Grand Final win when he kicked two goals. He won South Melbourne's Best and Fairest in 1934. Brain initially retired football at the end of 1937, but then played a season under throw-pass rules with Victorian Football Association club Camberwell in 1938.

References

External links

1907 births
1984 deaths
Australian rules footballers from Melbourne
Sydney Swans players
Sydney Swans Premiership players
Camberwell Football Club players
Bob Skilton Medal winners
One-time VFL/AFL Premiership players
People from South Melbourne